The Northeastern coastal forests are a temperate broadleaf and mixed forests ecoregion of the northeast and middle Atlantic region of the United States. The ecoregion covers an area of 34,630 sq miles (89,691 km2) encompassing the Piedmont and coastal plain of seven states, extending from coastal southwestern Maine, southeastern New Hampshire, eastern Massachusetts, and Rhode Island, southward through Connecticut, New York State, New Jersey, southeast Pennsylvania, Delaware and Maryland.

The ecoregion is bounded on the east by the Atlantic Ocean. To the north, it transitions to the New England-Acadian forests, which cover most of northern and inland New England. To the west, the ecoregion transitions to Allegheny Highlands forests and the Appalachian-Blue Ridge forests of the Appalachian Mountains. To the south lie the Southeastern mixed forests and the Middle Atlantic coastal forests. The ecoregion surrounds the distinct Atlantic coastal pine barrens ecoregion, which covers portions of New Jersey, Long Island and Cape Cod in southeastern Massachusetts.

Climate
The climate in this ecoregion is the broad transition from the humid continental in the north to the humid subtropical climate in the south.

Flora
Oak forests dominate this ecoregion. American chestnut (Castanea dentata) was formerly important, but its population was devastated by the chestnut blight early in the 20th century.

Dry-mesic oak forests
Northeastern interior dry-mesic oak forests are found throughout this ecoregion. They cover large areas at low and middle elevations, typically on flat to gently rolling terrain. Red oak (Quercus rubra), white oak (Quercus alba), and black oak (Quercus velutina) are common oaks in this habitat. Other trees include hickories (Carya spp.), red maple (Acer rubrum), sugar maple (Acer saccharum), white ash (Fraxinus americana), tulip tree (Liriodendron tulipifera), American beech (Fagus grandifolia), black cherry (Prunus serotina), black birch (Betula lenta), black tupelo (Nyssa sylvatica), and American elm (Ulmus americana). Flowering dogwood (Cornus florida) is a common understory tree.

common shrubs are maple-leaved viburnum (viburnum acerifolium), spicebush (Lindera benzoin), and witch hazel (Hamamelis virginiana). In sandier or more acidic soils are mountain laurel (Kalmia latifolia), blueberry (Vaccinium pallidum), huckleberry (Gaylussacia baccata), and swamp azalea (Rhododendron viscosum).

Mayapple (Podophyllum peltatum) is a common herbaceous plant.

Hemlock-northern hardwood forests
Hemlock-northern hardwood forests occur in deep coves, moist flats, and ravines. They include sugar maple, yellow birch (Betula alleghaniensis), and beech. These trees often form a deciduous canopy, but are sometimes mixed with hemlock (Tsuga canadensis) or white pine (Pinus strobus). Other common trees include oaks (most commonly red oak), tuliptree, black cherry, and sweet birch. In the Northeast, red spruce (Picea rubens) can be a minor canopy associate. Hophornbeam (Ostrya virginiana) is frequent but not dominant.

Dry oak-pine forests
Central Appalachian dry oak-pine forests occur on dry sites with loamy to sandy soils. A mix of oak and pine tree species dominate the canopy, typically chestnut oak (Quercus prinus), Virginia pine (Pinus virginiana), and white pine (Pinus strobus), but sometimes white oak (Quercus alba) or scarlet oak (Quercus coccinea). Varying amounts of oaks and pines result in oak forests, mixed oak-pine forests, or small pine forests. Shrubs such as hillside blueberry (Vaccinium pallidum), black huckleberry (Gaylussacia baccata), and mountain laurel (Kalmia latifolia) are common in the understory and can form a dense layer.

Pine-oak rocky woodlands
Central Appalachian pine-oak rocky woodlands occur on lower-elevation hilltops, outcrops, and rocky slopes and have a patchy or open aspect. Pitch pine (Pinus rigida) and Virginia pine (Pinus virginiana) are common within their respective ranges. These pines are often mixed with dry-site oaks such as chestnut oak (Quercus prinus), bear oak (Quercus ilicifolia), northern red oak (Quercus rubra), and scarlet oak (Quercus coccinea).  Sprouts of chestnut (Castanea dentata) can also be found. In the northeast, eastern red-cedar (Juniperus virginiana) or hophornbeam (Ostrya virginiana) are sometimes important. In the understory, some areas have a fairly well-developed heath shrub layer, others a graminoid layer, the latter particularly common under deciduous trees such as oaks.

Successional plant communities
These occur in formerly cleared land, such as old farms, that have been abandoned. Eastern red cedar (Juniperus virginiana) are some of the first trees to occupy these lands.

Freshwater wetlands
Marshes occur where standing water is present for most of the year. Common reed (Phragmites australis) and cattails (Typha spp.) are often abundant.

Swamps and floodplains occur where standing water is present for only some parts of the year. Red maple is a common tree, and can be found with swamp tupelo, white ash, American elm, pin oak (Quercus palustris), swamp white oak (Quercus bicolor), and silver maple (Acer saccharinum). Spicebush is a common shrub. Skunk cabbage (Symplocarpus foetidus) is found here.

Fauna
Some of the animals that live in the Northeastern coastal deciduous forests are white-tailed deer, eastern gray squirrels, chipmunks, red foxes, sparrows, chickadees, copperheads, rattlesnakes, northern water snakes, box turtles, snapping turtles, black rat snakes, garter snakes, snails, American toads, coyotes, black bears, bobcats, beavers, woodchucks, skunks, and raccoons. Chickadees, white-tailed deer, and eastern gray squirrels can be seen quite often. Eastern wolves and eastern cougars used to be quite common, but are extirpated, causing endemic growth in deer populations near suburban areas, with eastern coyotes generally taking their place by the mid-20th century.
Moose may also be seen in some of the northernmost regions of the Northeastern coastal forests, though this is very, very rare. Other fauna that occupy the area include bog turtles, ducks, rabbits, eagles, and (formerly) Canada lynx and sea mink.

Areas of intact habitat
The following natural areas are within this ecoregion

 New Hampshire
 Bear Brook State Park
 Pawtuckaway State Park
 Massachusetts
 Douglas State Forest
 Freetown-Fall River State Forest
 Hockomock Swamp
 Parker River National Wildlife Refuge
 Frederick Weston Memorial Forest
 Wompatuck State Park
 Rhode Island
 Arcadia Management Area
 Great Swamp Management Area
 Connecticut
 Meshomasic State Forest
 Natchaug State Forest
 Pachaug State Forest
 Yale-Myers Forest
 New York
 Bear Mountain State Park
 Black Rock Forest
 Clarence Fahnestock State Park
 Harriman State Park
 Hudson Highlands State Park
 Oyster Bay National Wildlife Refuge
 Sterling Forest State Park
 Storm King State Park
 New Jersey
 Abram S. Hewitt State Forest
 Cheesequake State Park
 Great Piece Meadows
 Jenny Jump State Forest
 Mahlon Dickerson Reservation
 Norvin Green State Forest
 Rancocas State Park
 Ringwood State Park
 Troy Meadows
 Wawayanda State Park
 Pennsylvania
 Hopewell Big Woods
 Ridley Creek State Park
 Evansburg State Park
 French Creek State Park
 Maryland
 Patuxent River State Park
 Elk Neck State Forest
 Elk Neck State Park
 Delaware
 White Clay Creek State Park
 Brandywine Creek State Park
 Cedar Swamp Wildlife Area
 Bellevue State Park
 Auburn Valley State Park
 Valley Garden Park
 Alapocas Run State Park
 Middle Run Valley Natural Area
 Brandywine Park
 First State National Historical Park
 Forwood Preserve 
 Fox Point State Park
 Bringhurst Woods Park
 Rockwood Park
 Sellers Park
 Talley Day Park
 William M. Redd, Jr. Park
 The Hermitage (New Castle, Delaware)

See also

 List of ecoregions in the United States (WWF)

References

External links
 Northeastern coastal forests (World Wildlife Fund)
List of species and other data

Temperate broadleaf and mixed forests in the United States
Ecoregions of the United States

Forests of New York (state)
Forests of Pennsylvania
Plant communities of the Eastern United States
Plant communities of Maryland
Plant communities of New York (state)
Plant communities of Pennsylvania

Nearctic ecoregions